"Cryin'" is a single by guitarist Joe Satriani, released in 1992 through Relativity Records. The single contains two instrumental tracks from his Grammy-nominated fourth studio album The Extremist, with "Cryin'" reaching No. 24 on the U.S. Billboard Mainstream Rock chart.

Track listing

References

Joe Satriani songs
1992 songs
Rock instrumentals
1990s instrumentals